Sportspeople who died during their careers are covered in lists by sport, and in the case of motorsports by location.

Lists of sportspeople who died during their careers 

 List of American football players who died during their careers
 List of association footballers who died while playing
 List of Australian rules footballers who died during their careers
 List of basketball players who died during their careers
 List of baseball players who died during their careers
 List of deaths due to injuries sustained in boxing
 List of fatal accidents in cricket
 List of professional cyclists who died during a race
 List of ice hockey players who died during their careers
 List of marathon fatalities
List of triathlon fatalities
 List of fatal accidents in motorboat racing
 Rider deaths in motorcycle racing
 Driver deaths in motorsport
 List of Billown Course fatal accidents
 List of Brands Hatch Circuit fatal accidents
 List of fatal Champ Car accidents
 List of Daytona International Speedway fatalities
 List of Dundrod Circuit fatal accidents
 List of fatal Formula One accidents
 List of Hockenheimring fatal accidents
 List of fatalities at the Indianapolis Motor Speedway
 List of Kyalami Grand Prix Circuit fatal accidents
 List of 24 Hours of Le Mans fatal accidents
 List of Autodromo Nazionale Monza fatal accidents
 List of NASCAR fatal accidents
 List of Nürburgring fatal accidents
 Driver and co-driver deaths in rallying events
 List of Dakar Rally fatal accidents
 List of fatal World Rally Championship accidents
 List of Snaefell Mountain Course fatal accidents
 List of Circuit de Spa-Francorchamps fatal accidents
 List of Suzuka Circuit fatal accidents
 List of Watkins Glen International fatalities
 List of deaths on eight-thousanders
 List of people who died climbing Mount Everest
 List of fatal accidents in sailboat racing
 List of premature professional wrestling deaths (This list includes wrestlers that were active or retired from the sport but died before the age of 65.)
 Sudden cardiac death of athletes

Other sports 
Ilona Lucassen (1997–2020), Dutch judoka, suicide.
Lara van Ruijven (1992–2020), Dutch short track speed skater, auto immune disease.

See also 

 List of cricketers who were killed during military service
 List of footballers killed during World War II
 List of Victorian Football League players who died on active service
List of accidents involving sports teams

References